Sam Walters (born 25 December 2000) is a professional rugby league footballer who plays as a  forward for the Leeds Rhinos in the Super League.

He has spent time on loan from Leeds at the Batley Bulldogs in the Betfred Championship.

Background
Walters played his amateur rugby league with the Halton Farnworth Hornets

Career

Leeds Rhinos
Walters made his Super League début in round 14 of the 2020 Super League season for Leeds against the Catalans Dragons.

Walters has also played one game for Batley whilst out on loan where he scored against Leigh.On 24 September 2022, Walters played for Leeds in their 24-12 loss to St Helens RFC in the 2022 Super League Grand Final.

References

External links
Leeds Rhinos profile

2000 births
Living people
Batley Bulldogs players
Bradford Bulls players
English rugby league players
Leeds Rhinos players
Rugby league props
Rugby league players from Widnes